Saiprasad Gundewar (22 February 1978 – 10 May 2020) was an Indian actor and model. He was best known for his appearances in reality shows like Survivor and Splitsvilla, as well as acting in films such as PK (film) (2014), Bazaar (2018) and Rock On!!. He died in Los Angeles after a year-long battle with brain cancer.

Personal life 
Sai married fashion designer Sapna Amin in 2015. He struggled with brain cancer before succumbing to it on May 10 in Los Angeles.

Career
Sai played some significant cameos in films such as Yuvvraaj, P.K, Rockon!!, Pappu Can't Dance Saala, Me aur Main and David and also appeared in many Television commercials. He played the role of ticket seller in P.K

References

External links

1978 births
2020 deaths
Deaths from cancer in India
Place of death missing
Place of birth missing
Participants in Indian reality television series
Survivor (franchise) contestants
Hindi cinema